The Chrysler 20 is an American trailerable sailboat that was designed by Halsey Herreshoff and first built in 1977.

Production
The design was built by Chrysler Marine in Plano, Texas, United States, from 1977 to 1980, but it is now out of production.

Design
The Chrysler 20 is a recreational keelboat, built predominantly of fiberglass, with wood trim. It has a masthead sloop rig; a raked stem; a nearly-plum transom; an internally mounted, swing-up, spade-type rudder controlled by a tiller and a stub keel with a swing keel. It displaces  and carries  of ballast.

The boat is normally fitted with a small  outboard motor for docking and maneuvering.

The design has sleeping accommodation for four people, with a double "V"-berth in the bow cabin and two settee-style quarter berths in the main cabin. The optional head is a portable type, located under the bow cabin "V"-berth.

Operational history
The boat is supported by two active class clubs that organize racing events, the Chrysler Sailing Association and the Chrysler Sailors.

In a 2010 review Steve Henkel wrote, "The boat is nicely constructed, with good finish, smooth fiberglass cabin liner, and quality hardware (eg., Harken blocks). She doesn't look bad on the water either. Worst features: Probably the most unusual (and least attractive) feature of the Chrysler 20 is her inboard pivoting rudder. Very seldom is this type of rudder design used, since it is complicated (and therefore hard to repair), and subject to collecting weed and plastic bags on its leading edge. A flip-up outboard rudder hung on the transom would have been a better choice."

See also
List of sailing boat types

Similar sailboats
Buccaneer 200

References

External links
Photo of a Chrysler 20
Photo of a Chrysler 20

Keelboats
1970s sailboat type designs
Sailing yachts
Trailer sailers
Sailboat types built by Chrysler Marine
Sailboat type designs by Halsey Herreshoff